The 1887 South Australian Football Association season was the 11th season of the top-level Australian rules football competition in South Australia.

1887 saw Gawler, Hotham and West Adelaide join the SAFA with the last of those bearing no relation to the modern day  Bloods.

Premiership season

Round 1

Round 2

Round 3

Round 4

Round 5

Round 6

Round 7

Round 8

Round 9

Round 10

Round 11

Round 12

Round 13

Round 14

Round 15

Round 16

Round 17

Round 18

Round 19

Round 20

Ladder

References 

SANFL
South Australian National Football League seasons